Christian Lantignotti (born 18 March 1970 in Milan) is an Italian retired professional football player.

Career
Throughout his career, Lantignotti played 5 seasons (71 games, 3 goals) in the Italian Serie A for A.C. Milan, A.C. Reggiana 1919, and Cagliari Calcio.

Honours
Milan
 Supercoppa Italiana winner: 1988.
 European Cup winner: 1988–89, 1989–90.
 UEFA Super Cup winner: 1989.
 Intercontinental Cup winner: 1989.

References

External links
 
 European Champions Cup/UEFA Champions League Winning Squads

1970 births
Living people
Italian footballers
Serie A players
Serie B players
Footballers from Milan
A.C. Milan players
A.C. Reggiana 1919 players
A.C. Cesena players
Cagliari Calcio players
Calcio Padova players
Treviso F.B.C. 1993 players
A.C. Monza players
A.C.N. Siena 1904 players
Italian expatriate footballers
Expatriate footballers in San Marino
Italy under-21 international footballers
A.C. Bellaria Igea Marina players
Association football midfielders